The Dry River is a river in the extreme southeast of the North Island of New Zealand.  It feeds into the Ruamahanga River to the southwest of Martinborough.  The headwaters are in the Haurangi Forest Park, and its eventual outflow (via the Ruamahanga River) is into Cook Strait at Palliser Bay.

Dry River was the name of a sheep station about 1877, which later was renamed Dyerville. A vineyard called Dry River was established in the area in 1979.

References

Rivers of the Wellington Region
Rivers of New Zealand